Selibe Mochoboroane (e mots'o moratuoa)  is a Mosotho politician and the current Minister of Health due October 2022 in the government led by Sam Matekane. He is the youngest party leader of the newly founded Movement for Economic Change (MEC), which was announced on 1 February 2017. He formed this political party after he was suspended from the Lesotho Congress for Democracy (LCD) which is led by former deputy prime minister Mothejoa Metsing.

He has served as a minister in the ministries of local government & chieftainship, Communications Science and Technology, Energy & Metereology,  Small Business & Cooperatives as well as development planning. Mochoboroane is the current member of parliament for the Thabana-Morena constituency in Mafeteng, Lesotho. He was also the chairperson of the Public Accounts Committee (PAC) of the 10th parliament of Lesotho.

References

Year of birth missing (living people)
Living people
Lesotho Congress for Democracy politicians
Members of the Parliament of Lesotho